Frederick Wade "Fritz" Mote (June 2, 1922 – February 10, 2005) was an American sinologist and a professor of History at Princeton University for nearly 50 years. His research and teaching interests focused on China during the Yuan and Ming dynasties. In collaboration with Denis C. Twitchett and John K. Fairbank he helped create The Cambridge History of China, a monumental (though still incomplete) history of China.

Life and career
Mote was born in Plainview, Nebraska, one of ten children. In 1943 (during World War II) he enlisted in the U.S. Army Air Force but was unable to go to flight school for medical reasons. Due to a college course he took in Chinese language the year before, the Air Force sent Mote to Harvard where he studied Chinese under John K. Fairbank for a year. In 1944, he joined the Office of Strategic Services (the war-time precursor to the CIA) as a noncommissioned officer,  serving in the China-Burma-India theater of operations until 1946.

After the war he enrolled in the University of Nanjing and graduated in 1948 with a degree in Chinese history. While the Chinese Communists took over Beijing in 1949, he was working as a language officer for the U.S. Embassy. Forced to leave China in 1950, he continued his studies in the United States at the University of Washington, earning a Ph.D. in 1954 with a dissertation entitled "T'ao Tsung-i and his Cho Keng Lu", a study of the 14th century writer Tao Zongyi (1321c. 1412). He was hired by Princeton University two years later and remained there until just a few years before his death (he retired from active teaching in 1987). During the 1960s, Mote was able to secure financial resources from the Rockefeller and Ford foundations so the Gest Library could obtain a valuable collection of Chinese documents. He was awarded Guggenheim Fellowships in two different years.

In 1980, Twitchett came to teach at Princeton and the two men worked closely together for the next eight years, co-editing volumes 7 and 8 of The Cambridge History of China. Curiously, both men had been part of Intelligence agencies during World War II. In addition to his work as an editor, Professor Mote wrote 23 different chapters in the books of the series. Near the end of his life he published the massive book Imperial China 900-1800 (1999) which sums up (and in a few cases updates) Volumes 5, 6, 7, 8, and 9 of The Cambridge History of China series.

Mote married Ch’en Hsiao-Lan in China in 1950. She survived him after a marriage of 55 years.

Selected works 
  Review article on Karl August Wittfogel's Oriental Despotism: A Comparative Study of Total Power.
 The Poet Kao Ch'i, 1335–1374 (1962). Princeton: Princeton University Press.
 
 Intellectual Foundations of China (1971). New York: Knopf.
 (As translator): K. C. Hsiao, A History of Chinese Political Thought, Volume 1: From the Beginnings to the Sixth Century AD (1979).  Princeton, NJ: Princeton University Press. 
 The Cambridge History of China, Volume 7 - The Ming Dynasty, 1368 - 1644, Part I (edited by Mote and Twitchett) (1988)
 The Cambridge History of China, Volume 7 - The Ming Dynasty, 1368 - 1644, Part II (edited by Mote and Twitchett) (1988)
 Imperial China: 900–1800 (1999). Cambridge, MA: Harvard University Press.

References

Citations

Sources 

 
 
 Atwell, William S. "Frederick W. Mote 1922-2005", The East Asian Library Journal 12, no. 1 (2006): 1-12, accessed August 29, 2016, 
 
 

1922 births
2005 deaths
20th-century American historians
20th-century American male writers
Harvard University alumni
Historians of China
People of the Office of Strategic Services
Princeton University faculty
American sinologists
University of Washington alumni
People from Plainview, Nebraska
Chinese Civil War refugees
American male non-fiction writers
United States Army Air Forces personnel of World War II
American expatriates in China